The Great Magician is a 2011 Hong Kong-Chinese action fantasy-comedy film directed by Derek Yee and starring Tony Leung Chiu-Wai, Lau Ching-wan and Zhou Xun.

Plot
In the years after the Revolution in which the Qing Dynasty in China is overthrown and the Republic is established, China is broken up into fiefdoms held by warlords, who are busy fighting each other. A butler, Liu Kunshan (Wu Gang), uses magic to scare convicts into joining the army of warlord Lei Bully (Lau Ching-wan). Lei Bully has six wives and also imprisons a girl, Liu Yin (Zhou Xun), and wants her to be his seventh wife willingly. A group of local revolutionaries want to kidnap Lei and bring back the republic. They team up with a magician, Chang Hsien (Tony Leung Chiu-Wai), to entice Lei to a magic show and kidnap him during the show. It is revealed that Chang and Liu Yin had been ex-lovers and Chang is an apprentice of Liu's father, a magician, Liu Wanyao. Chang discovers that his former master was imprisoned by Liu Kunshan as he had wanted to extract a magic secret from Liu Wanyao.

The two ex-lovers meet during Chang's magic show. Chang wants to run away with Liu Yin but she refuses to leave Lei to ensure her father's safety so that he will not be killed. Lei and Chang become close friends. Despite knowing one another's background, they pretend not to know. Chang discovers that his master was tortured by Liu Kunshan and that he had a secret to hide and informs Lei. Lei asks Chang to investigate Liu Kunshan and subsequently discovers that Liu Kunshan is a member of the Qing Dynasty remnants and wants to bring back the Dynasty by collaborating with the Japanese.

Lei discovers that Butler Liu Kunshan had an affair with his third wife and demands that they both leave. With his cover blown, Liu Kunshan and the Japanese launch an attack on Lei and his fellow warlords but Chang and Lei plan an elaborate scheme to hide that Lei and Liu Yin are dead. With the rest of the Qing Dynasty remnants, Liu Kunshan tries to raise an army by magic via Chang. However, the scheme is revealed and the Qing Dynasty remnants are killed or arrested.

Lei subsequently disbands his army and gives away his riches to pursue being a weapons researcher and also pursue Liu Yin. Liu Yin decides not to follow either Lei or Chang and both Lei and Chang chase Liu Yin on equal ground.

Cast
 Tony Leung Chiu-Wai as Chang Hsien
 Lau Ching-wan as Lei Bully
 Zhou Xun as Liu Yin
 Yan Ni as Lei's wife
 Wu Gang as Butler Liu Kunshan
 Paul Chun as Liu Wanyao
 Alex Fong as Chen Kuo
 Lam Suet as Li Fengjen
 Daniel Wu as Captain Tsai
 Kenya Sawada as Mitearai
 Tsui Hark as Warlord
Wang Ziwen as Li Jiao

Awards and nominations
32nd Hong Kong Film Awards
 Nominated: Best Actress (Zhou Xun)
 Nominated: Best Costume Make Up Design (Yee Chung-man and Jessie Dai)

References

External links
 
 

2011 films
Hong Kong action comedy films
Films directed by Derek Yee
Films about magic and magicians
Chinese mystery films
Chinese action comedy films
Films based on Chinese novels